The Recapture of Recife (or Second Siege of Recife) was a military engagement between the Portuguese forces under Francisco Barreto de Meneses and the Dutch forces of Captain Walter Van Loo. After the Dutch defeats at Guararapes, their surviving men, as well as other garrisons of New Holland, joined in the area of Recife (Mauritsstad) in order to make a last stand. However, after fierce fighting, the Portuguese victoriously entered the city and the remaining Dutch were ousted from Brazil.

Background

After the Portuguese Independence from Spain in 1640, the Dutch West India Company recalled Johan Maurits to Europe in 1644, in an attempt to cut military expenditures. Soon after, the WIC faced a major uprising of Portuguese planters in June 1645. The Portuguese planters around Pernambuco had never fully accepted Dutch rule, and had also resented the high interest rates charged by Dutch moneylenders for loans to rebuild their plantations following the initial Dutch conquest. In August, the planters revolted and prevailed over Dutch forces in a minor battle fought outside Recife, effectively ending Dutch control over the colony. That year, the Portuguese gained Várzea, Sirinhaém, Pontal de Nazaré, the Fort of Porto Calvo, and Fort Maurits. By 1646, the WIC only controlled four toeholds along the Brazilian coast, chief among them being Recife.

In the spring of 1646, the Dutch sent a relief expedition to Recife consisting of 20 ships with 2000 men, temporarily forestalling the fall of the city. In 1647, in return for acquiescing with the Peace of Munster with Spain, the Dutch province of Zeeland obtained promises from the other Dutch provinces to support a second, larger relief expedition to reconquer Brazil. The expedition, consisting of 41 ships with 6000 men, set sail on December 26, 1647.

In Brazil, the Dutch had already abandoned Itamaracá on December 13, 1647. The new expeditionary force arrived late at Recife, with many of its soldiers either dead or mutinous from lack of pay. In April 1648, the Portuguese routed the expeditionary force at the First Battle of Guararapes, fought outside Recife. The Portuguese had sent an armada of 84 ships, including 18 warships to recapture Recife. In February 1649, the Portuguese again routed the Dutch at the Second Battle of Guararapes.

Recapture of Recife

After the Dutch defeats at Guararapes, their surviving men, as well as other garrisons of New Holland, joined in the area of Recife in order to make a last stand. However, after fierce fighting and a two-year siege, the Portuguese victoriously entered the city on 28 January 1654.

Aftermath

The remaining Dutch forces were ousted from Brazil, leaving to the Portuguese their colony of Brazil and putting an end to Nieuw Netherlands.

Notes

References
 

History of South America
Military history of Brazil
Battles of the Dutch–Portuguese War
Battles involving Portugal
Battles involving Brazil
Battles involving the Dutch Republic
Portuguese colonization of the Americas

 
1650s in Brazil
Pernambuco
History of Recife